Grimson is a surname which may refer to:

Allan Grimson (born 1958), British murderer
Eric Grimson (born 1953), Canadian-born computer scientist, professor at Massachusetts Institute of Technology
George Grimson (1915–1944), Royal Air Force bomber crewman
Gudmunder Grimson (1878–1965), American lawyer, Justice of North Dakota Supreme Court
Jane Grimson (born 1949), Scottish-born computer engineer, Pro-Chancellor of University of Dublin
Matthew Grimson (1968–2018), Canadian musician
Stu Grimson (born 1965), Canadian professional ice hockey player
Grimson, a family of musicians that flourished in London from 1870

See also
Gimson, surname